The Secretary-General of the Executive Yuan is the chief of staff of the Executive Yuan, the executive branch of the Taiwan central government, who handles administrative affairs, and is assisted by two deputy Secretaries-General.

List
Political Party:

See also
 Executive Yuan
 Government of the Republic of China
 Politics of the Republic of China

References

External links
 Secretary-General, Spokesperson

Executive Yuan
Lists of Taiwanese politicians